Ulla Jacobsson (23 May 1929 – 20 August 1982) was a Swedish actress. She had the lead role in One Summer of Happiness (1951) and played the only female speaking role in the film Zulu (1964).

Early life 
Jacobsson was born in Mölndal, Gothenburg and Bohus County, Sweden on May 23, 1929.

Career 
Jacobsson was one of 48 candidates chosen to attend Gothenburg Acting City Theatre School. She began acting in this theatre in 1952. She began her professional career in her native Gothenburg and appeared in classical and modern theater roles before turning to film. Jacobsson's first acting role was of the Bride Nissa in the drama The Sea in Fire (1951); although, she may be best known for her role in Zulu (1964) where she played the only female speaking role.

Beginning in the late 1950s, Jacobsson stopped acting in Swedish films, and appeared in films from the US, France, Spain, Germany, and England. Jacobsson made her first U.S.-made film appearance in The Grand Duke and Mr. Pimm. According to "Metropolitan Life," Jacobsson believed she could be successful in acting and marriage. She only took two acting jobs a year to travel with her husband. She stated: "When a very good part comes, there is temptation to take it, but I refuse. I love success. I love to make myself something. But I love more my husband and children."

Jacobsson became internationally famous for her nude scenes in One Summer of Happiness (1951). This, along with her role in the American film Love Is a Ball (1963), was an attempt to make her a sex symbol. This was common among female actresses in the 1960s. One Summer of Happiness won the top prize at the Cannes Film Festival in 1951. Bosley Crowther, New York Times writer, stated: "Ulla Jacobsson as the farm girl is a sensitive and expressive young thing who stunningly portrays the caprices and the terrors of an innocent maid in love."

In 1963, she appeared in the first season episode, "The Final Hour", of the US TV show The Virginian, in the role of Policia. Her popularity among mass audiences gained her the role of Margaretta Witt in the adventure film Zulu (1964). Other notable roles include Ingmar Bergman's Smiles of a Summer Night (1955), The Heroes of Telemark (1965) and La Servante (1970). A notable award was the German Film Award for Supporting Actress in Alle Jahre wieder (1967). She made appearances in film and television shows until 1979.

Personal life 
Jacobsson's first husband was a Viennese engineer named Josef Kornfeld. This marriage brought her Austrian citizenship. They also had a daughter named Ditte. During the 1950s, Jacobsson married her second husband, Dutch painter Frank Lodeizen (1931–2013), with whom she had a son named Martin. In 1960 she married her third husband, Austrian doctor Hans Winfried Rohsmann (1918–2002), and moved to Vienna, Austria.

Death 

Jacobsson died in Vienna, Austria from bone cancer on August 20, 1982, she was 53 years old. She was buried at the Wiener Zentralfriedhof.

Legacy 
In 2015, a town square in Mölndal was named after Jacobsson.

Filmography

References

Further reading

External links 

 
 

1929 births
1982 deaths
20th-century Swedish actresses
Swedish film actresses
Austrian film actresses
Swedish expatriates in Austria
People from Gothenburg
Deaths from bone cancer
Deaths from cancer in Austria
Burials at the Vienna Central Cemetery
20th-century Austrian actresses